Yasna Provoste Campillay (born 16 December 1969) is a Chilean teacher and Christian Democrat politician of Diaguita descent, who served as minister during the presidencies of Ricardo Lagos and Michelle Bachelet.

In 2008, after frauds committed by the civil servant Franka Grez, Provoste began to be questioned by parliamentarians of the then centre-right opposition ―Alianza por Chile— for not having been aware of that omission, that is, the systematic appropriation and concealment which Grez practiced in the four years where she operated (2004−2008). Thus, on 14 April, the Chilean Senate ―by 20 votes over 18― found her guilty of the loss of more than US$ 600 million in the so-called "Subsidies case", and was disqualified from holding public office for five years. By the other hand, Grez was sentenced to eleven years in prison for embezzlement and diversion of funds to her relatives and close friends, actions that were estimated at $CLP 310 million.

After her self-exile in Canada from 2008 until 2009, she moved to Vallenar. She was then elected in 2013 as deputy for the Atacama Region's 6th District. She became President of the Senate of Chile in March 2021 after the resignation of Adriana Muñoz. Provoste resigned from this position in August 2021 to focus on her candidacy for President of Chile, which she lost in the first round.

Early life
Provoste was born in Vallenar in northern Chile to a family of Diaguita descent. At the age of nine she was a national champion in gymnastics, for which she received a scholarship to study at the women's boarding school in Santiago. Back in Vallenar she switched to athletics, becoming a pentathlon champion.

Provoste majored in physical education at the Playa Ancha University of Educational Sciences in Valparaíso. She pursued postgraduate studies in education administration at the same university, and in local government and decentralization in Colombia. During her university years she was twice president of the student board and was a member of the student's federation.

Political career
During the Eduardo Frei Ruiz-Tagle administration Provoste was the director of the National Women's Service in the Atacama Region from 1996 to 1997 and governor of the Huasco Province from 1997 to 2001. During President Ricardo Lagos's tenure she was intendant of the Atacama Region from 2001 to 2004, minister of Planning from 2004 to 2006 and, during Michelle Bachelet's presidency, national executive director of Integra Foundation in 2006 and Minister of Education from 2006 to 2008.

Impeachment trial
In February 2008, the Office of the General Auditor of the Republic reported that around US$500 million of funds transferred by the Education Ministry to public and subsidized private schools during 2004 to 2008 were not properly accounted for and that nearly US$600 thousand were illegally transferred by Franka Grez to private school managers and her siblings Juan Pablo and Edmundo Grez. There were also reports of financial mismanagement in other areas, as well as duplicate enrollment of thousands of students.

Thus, Provoste was accused by the opposition deputies Iván Moreira and José Antonio Kast, both from the right-wing party Independent Democratic Union, for not correcting these irregularities. They urged members of their coalition to impeach her for violating article 52, number 2, letter b of the Constitution in her capacity as Minister of Education. On 3 April 2008, the Chamber of Deputies suspended her from her position. The Senate then heard her case on 15 April 2008 and voted to impeach her the following day on one out of five counts.

After the impeachment trial, Provoste was immediately removed from her position and was disqualified from office for the next five years. Meanwhile, Franka Grez received an eleven-year prison sentence for having illegally transferred public funds for four years.

Vote details

Chamber of Deputies:

Admissibility of impeachment against the Minister of Education Yasna Provoste.
Yes: 59 (50.9%) [All opposition-party deputies, plus independent deputy Marta Isasi, and former Christian Democrat members Alejandra Sepúlveda, Jaime Mulet, Eduardo Díaz del Río and Carlos Olivares.]
No: 55 (47.4%) [All  deputies, except Christian Democrat deputies Gabriel Ascencio and Pablo Lorenzini, Party for Democracy deputy René Alinco, and Socialist deputy Laura Soto.]
Abstention: 2 (1.7%) [ deputies René Alinco and Pablo Lorenzini.]
Not present: 3 [Former Christian Democrat member Pedro Araya Guerrero, Christian Democrat deputy Gabriel Ascencio and former Party for Democracy member Esteban Valenzuela.]
Barred from voting: 1 [Socialist deputy Laura Soto.]

Senate:

Count 1: Not correcting the grave infringements and irregularities committed by Ministerial Secretary of Education of the Santiago Metropolitan Region in the handling of public funds.
Yes: 20 (52.6%) [Votes by senators from the opposition parties Independent Democratic Union and National Renewal, by former  senators Fernando Flores and Adolfo Zaldívar, and by independent senator Carlos Bianchi.]
No: 18 (47.4%) [Votes by senators from the governing  coalition.]
Abstention: 0 (0.0%)
Result: Approved.
Count 2: Not applying sanctions in the cases of grave infractions to the subsidizing law.
Yes: 19 (50.0%) [Same as Count 1, minus Bianchi.]
No: 19 (50.0%) [Same as Count 1, plus Bianchi.]
Abstention: 0 (0.0%)
Result: Rejected.
Count 3: Not dismissing the Ministerial Secretary of Education of the Santiago Metropolitan Region, who was administratively responsible for the grave infractions and irregularities.
Yes: 4 (10.5%) [Four opposition-party senators.]
No: 34 (89.5%)
Abstention: 0 (0.0%)
Result: Rejected.
Count 4: Ignoring the results and recommendations of audits that revealed the very grave irregularities committed in different programs and regions of the country.
Yes: 14 (36.8%) [Thirteen opposition-party senators, plus Zaldívar.]
No: 24 (63.2%)
Abstention: 0 (0.0%)
Result: Rejected.
Count 5: Providing inaccurate or intentionally incomplete information to the public opinion and to the Chamber of Deputies, thus violating the principle of administrative probity.
Yes: 3 (7.9%) [Three opposition-party senators.]
No: 34 (89.5%)
Abstention: 1 (2.6%) [Former  senator Fernando Flores.]
Result: Rejected.

Post-impeachment life
Shortly after her impeachment Provoste moved to Canada to study. On 15 October 2008 she filed a suit against the Chilean state before the Inter-American Commission on Human Rights.<ref>Provoste demanda a Chile ante la Comisión Interamericana de DD.HH. por su destitución, El Mercurio, October 16, 2008.</ref>

Provoste returned to Chile in mid-2009, residing in Vallenar. In November 2010 she was elected president of the Christian Democrat Party in the Atacama Region with 80% of the vote, allowing her to be part of the party's National Council.

Return to politics
In November 2013, she was elected a deputy at Chile's lower chamber of Congress, representing District 6 of the Atacama Region of northern Chile.

On 17 March 2021, Provoste became President of the Senate of Chile after the resignation of Adriana Muñoz.

Presidential race
Primaries elections
On 23 July 2021, Provoste announced her candidacy for the Presidency of Chile in Vallenar, her hometown. During her announcement, she said she was willing to go through any mechanism to name the candidate of the Chilean centre-left. Then, the centre-left coalition Constituent Unity announced presidential primary elections, whose candidates were Provoste, Paula Narváez from the Socialist Party and the lawyer Carlos Maldonado, president of the Radical Party of Chile.

On 31 July, during a visit that Provoste made to a vegetable fair in Puente Alto, she was confronted by activists who made references to her impeachment in 2008. After the visit, she claimed to have experienced an unpleasant moment and that, even so, she will bet on "the culture of dialogue". After the activists' confrontation against Provoste, the political commentator Fernando Paulsen remarked that she and the official presidential candidate Gabriel Boric have been victims of false accusations; in the case of Boric, the former communist candidate Daniel Jadue accused him of being responsible for allowing "political prisoners" in Chile by voting for the Anti-Barricade Law.

On 2 August, she participated in the first televised general debate for the 2021 presidential election, which was covered by La Red and Canal 13. According to analyst Marta Lagos, the proposals of Provoste, Maldonado and Narváez were "strikingly alike". Lagos also pointed out that the debate format is like those found on Chilean television where the candidates argue with the debate host instead of their competitors. Nevertheless, Maldonado openly criticized Provoste during the debate for announcing her candidacy late, making the Constituent Unity miss the legal primaries on 18 July.

She won her coalition's primaries on 21 August 2021 and resigned from the Senate presidency on 24 August as a result.

Presidential elections
On 21 November 2021, she lost the election after finishing in the fifth place with 815,558 votes (11.61%). According to La Tercera'', her centrist electorate was captured by Franco Parisi, who finished ahead of Provoste as well as centre-right candidate Sebastián Sichel.

References

1969 births
Living people
Chilean Ministers of Education
People from Vallenar
Impeached officials removed from office
Christian Democratic Party (Chile) politicians
Women government ministers of Chile
University of Playa Ancha alumni
Pontifical Xavierian University alumni
Chilean people of Diaguita descent
Women members of the Chamber of Deputies of Chile
Women members of the Senate of Chile
Presidents of the Senate of Chile
Candidates for President of Chile
Members of the Chamber of Deputies of Chile
Government ministers of Chile
Presidents of the University of Playa Ancha Students Federation
Senators of the LV Legislative Period of the National Congress of Chile
Senators of the LVI Legislative Period of the National Congress of Chile
Impeached Chilean officials